Somerset High School is a public school serving grades 9 through 12 in Somerset, St. Croix County, Wisconsin, United States.

Notable alumni
Jenny Hansen - University of Kentucky gymnast (1992–1996).  Hansen won three consecutive NCAA All-Around titles between 1993 and 1995.  She also won a total of eight national championships over her collegiate career.
Michael Schachtner - University of Wisconsin - Green Bay basketball player (2005–2009).  Schachtner is a professional basketball player.  He played the 2009–2010 season for the Kapfenberg Bulls of the Austrian Basketball League.
Bryan Witzmann - offensive lineman for NFL's Minnesota Vikings

References

External links
Somerset School District
Village of Somerset

Public high schools in Wisconsin
Schools in St. Croix County, Wisconsin